KHSB may refer to:

 KHSB-FM, a radio station (104.7 FM) licensed to serve Kingsland, Texas, United States
 KHSB-LD, a low-power television station (channel 33) licensed to serve Steamboat Springs, Colorado, United States